Michael Foreman may refer to:

 Michael Foreman (astronaut) (born 1957), American astronaut
 Michael Foreman (author/illustrator) (born 1938), British author and illustrator